Diana Yevhenivna Varinska (born 22 March 2001) is a retired Ukrainian artistic gymnast. She is the 2019 European Games all-around and balance beam bronze medalist. Additionally, she was a member of the team that won Ukraine's first European team title at the 2020 European Championships. She represented Ukraine at the 2020 Summer Olympics.

Junior career 
In 2015, Varinska competed in the European Youth Olympic Festival. She scored a 53.050 all-around in qualifications, which qualified her to the all-around final, and the uneven bars final. In the all-around, she scored a 51.100, placing 17th. In the uneven bars final, she came 4th, scoring 14.650: a significant improvement on her qualifying bars score of 14.100 and 2.5 points higher than her all-around bars score of 12.150.

2016 brought three international competitions for Varinska. In February, she swept the junior division of the Antonia Koshel Cup competition, held in Minsk, Belarus. Varinska placed first on every apparatus, and also in the all-around. In June, Varinska competed at the 2016 European Women's Artistic Gymnastics Championships, held in Bern, Switzerland. She placed 30th in the all-around competition, with a score of 50.099. She achieved a 13.900 on vault, 11.200 on the uneven bars, 12.366 on the balance beam, and 12.633 on the floor exercise.  Varinska did not qualify into any finals. She contributed to the Ukrainian team's 152.787 points, to achieve an 11th-place finish in the team qualification.

Varinska's final international outing in 2016 saw her compete only uneven bars, balance beam, and floor exercise. She competed at the Belarusian Championships, where she qualified for all three finals. She did not, however, compete in those finals as both she and her teammate, Angelina Kysla, were unranked during the qualifications, due to not being Belarusian.

Senior career

2017 
Varinska turned 16 in 2017, which qualified her to compete in the senior division of competitions. She began her senior career at the Baku World Cup. She competed only on the uneven bars, qualifying in first place to the final. In the finals, she took the gold medal with a 13.933. The 2017 European Gymnastics Championships saw Varinska compete only on the uneven bars in qualification. She scored a disappointing 12.766 and failed to qualify into the final.

In May, Varinska competed in the Osijek Challenge Cup, held in Osijek, Croatia. She competed on the uneven bars, beam, and floor exercise in qualifications. She qualified into the beam and floor finals, but did not place, coming in 7th on beam and 4th on floor. In June, a video of Varinska's bars routine at the Ukraine Cup, an internal Ukrainian competition, emerged online. Fans were excited by its difficulty and good execution, but noted Varinska's tendency to falter in competition did not guarantee her success on the world stage at the World Championships, to be held in Montreal, Canada. However, she still competed well at these championships, qualifying to the uneven bars final and placing sixth with a clean routine. She hit all of her bar routines throughout the competition.

2018 
Throughout the beginning of 2018, Varinska competed at multiple FIG World Cups, winning gold on uneven bars, balance beam, and floor exercise in Osijek. In August she competed at the European Championships where she helped Ukraine finish fifth in the team competition; however she failed to qualify to any individual event finals.

In October, Varinska represented Ukraine at the World Championships in Doha. The Ukrainian team finished 20th in the team qualification. Individually Varinska finished 37th in the all-around qualification and 14th on the balance beam and therefore did not qualify for any event finals.

2019 
In March, Varinska competed at both the Baku and Doha World Cups as well as the Stella Zakharova Cup. The following month she competed at the European Championships where she qualified to the all-around final in fifteenth place. During the final she improved her ranking and finished in seventh place. In June, Varinska competed at the second European Games where she qualified to both the all-around and balance beam finals. During the all-around final she won the bronze medal behind Angelina Melnikova of Russia and Lorette Charpy of France. During the balance beam final she once again won bronze, this time behind Nina Derwael of Belgium and Melnikova.  In September Varinska competed at the Paris Challenge Cup where she won gold on floor exercise and bronze on balance beam.

Varinska competed at the World Championships in Stuttgart. She helped Ukraine finish fifteenth as a team during qualifications but they did not manage to qualify a team to the Olympic Games. However, Varinska finished twenty-sixth in the all-around and qualified to the final and as an individual to the Olympic Games in Tokyo.  During the all-around final Varinska finished in fifteenth place. In late October and November, Varinska competed at the Arthur Gander Memorial, where she won bronze, the Swiss Cup where she and Oleg Vernyayev won silver behind the American team of Jade Carey and Allan Bower, and the Cottbus World Cup where she won silver on the balance beam.

2020 
Varinska began the season competing at the Melbourne World Cup where she won gold on uneven bars and placed fourth on balance beam. In March, she competed at the American Cup where she finished in 10th place. Most of the remaining meets scheduled to take place in 2020, including the Olympic Games, where either canceled or postponed until 2021 due to the worldwide COVID-19 pandemic. Varinska returned to competition in October at the Szombathely Challenge Cup where she won gold on uneven bars and placed fifth and fourth on balance beam and floor exercise respectively.

Prior to the European Championships, Varinska tested positive for COVID-19 and did not train for fourteen days as a result. However, she was able to return in time to compete at the European Championships. During qualifications, she helped Ukraine qualify second to the team final behind Romania and individually she qualified to the floor exercise final. During the team final, Ukraine came out and won their first ever team gold medal at a European Championships.

2021 

Varinska represented Ukraine at the 2020 Summer Olympics (postponed to 2021 due to the COVID-19 pandemic). During the qualification round, she placed 62nd with a total score of 49.565.  In December Varinska announced her engagement to Kazakh Olympic gymnast Milad Karimi.

2022 
Varinska announced her retirement from the sport on August 13.

Competitive history

References

External links 
 
 

2001 births
Living people
Ukrainian female artistic gymnasts
European Games bronze medalists for Ukraine
European Games medalists in gymnastics
Gymnasts at the 2019 European Games
European champions in gymnastics
Gymnasts from Kyiv
Gymnasts at the 2020 Summer Olympics
Olympic gymnasts of Ukraine
21st-century Ukrainian women